Cherkinlu (also Romanized as Cherkīnlū; also known as Cherkenlū) is a village in Garmeh-ye Jonubi Rural District, in the Central District of Meyaneh County, East Azerbaijan Province, Iran. At the 2006 census, its population was 494, in 117 families.

References 

Populated places in Meyaneh County